Zhide may refer to:

Worth It (album), known as Zhide in Mandarin, a 1996 Mandopop album by Sammi Cheng

Historical eras
Zhide (至德, 583–586), era name used by Chen Shubao, emperor of the Chen dynasty
Zhide (至德, 756–758), era name used by Emperor Suzong of Tang